Reginald of Piperno (or Reginald of Priverno) was an Italian Dominican, theologian and companion of St. Thomas Aquinas.

Biography
Reginald was born at Piperno about 1230. Since 1927 this town of the Lazio region in central Italy is Priverno.  He entered the Dominican Order at Naples. St. Thomas Aquinas chose him as his socius and confessor at Rome about 1265. From that time Reginald was the constant and intimate companion of the saint.

By November 1268 Aquinas had completed his tenure at the Santa Sabina studium provinciale, the forerunner of the studium generale at Santa Maria sopra Minerva which would be transformed in the 16th century into the College of Saint Thomas, and then in the 20th century into the Pontifical University of Saint Thomas Aquinas, Angelicum.  Reginald was with Aquinas and Nicholas Brunacci [1240-1322], Aquinas' student from Santa Sabina as they left Viterbo on their way to Paris to begin the academic year.

Thomas dedicated several of his works to Reginald.

In 1272 Reginald began to teach with Thomas at Naples. He attended at Thomas' death-bed, received his general confession, and pronounced the funeral oration in 1274. He returned to Naples, and probably succeeded to the chair of his master. He died about 1290.

Reginald's testimony is continually cited in the process of Thomas' canonization.

Writings
Reginald collected all the works of St. Thomas. Four of the Opuscula ('small works') are reports he made of lectures delivered by the Saint, either taken down during the lecture or afterwards written out from memory. These are: Postilla super Joannem (corrected by St. Thomas), Postillae super Epistolas S. Pauli, Postilla super Tres Nocturnos Psalterii and Lectura super Primum de Anima.

Reginald is also considered by some as the compiler of the Supplement to the Summa Theologiae. This supplement was meant to afford completion to the unfinished Summa Theologiae, and it was composed out of book IV of Aquinas's Commentary to the Sentences.

The funeral discourse published at Bologna in 1529 under the name of Reginald is the work of the Italian humanist Joannes Antonius Flaminius.

Sources

References

1230 births
1290 deaths
Italian Dominicans
13th-century Italian Roman Catholic theologians
People from Lazio